The Irish cricket team toured Zimbabwe between 9 and 20 October 2015. The tour consisted of three One Day International (ODI) matches and a four-day game. Zimbabwe won the three-match ODI series 2–1 and the tour match was drawn.

Squads

ODI series

1st ODI

2nd ODI

3rd ODI

Tour match

First-class: Zimbabwe A vs Ireland

References

External links
 Series home at ESPN Cricinfo

2015 in Irish cricket
2015 in Zimbabwean cricket
International cricket competitions in 2015–16
Irish cricket tours of Zimbabwe